Kütahya (historically, Cotyaeum or Kotyaion, Greek: Κοτύαιον) is a city in western Turkey which lies on the Porsuk River, at 969 metres above sea level. It is inhabited by some 578,640 people (2022 estimate). The region of Kütahya has large areas of gentle slopes with agricultural land culminating in high mountain ridges to the north and west.

History

Byzantine period

The ancient world knew present-day Kütahya as Cotyaeum (Κοτύαιον). It became part of the Roman province of Phrygia Salutaris, but in about 820 became the capital of the new province of Phrygia Salutaris III. 

Its bishopric thus changed from being a suffragan of  Synnada to a metropolitan see, although with only three suffragan sees according to the Notitia Episcopatuum of Byzantine Emperor Leo VI the Wise (886-912), which is dated to around 901–902. According to the 6th-century historian John Malalas, Cyrus of Panopolis, who had been prefect of the city of Constantinople, was sent there as bishop by Emperor Theodosius II (408-50), after four bishops of the city had been killed. (Two other sources make Cyrus bishop of Smyrna instead.) The bishopric of Cotyaeum was headed in 431 by Domnius, who attended the Council of Ephesus, and in 451 by Marcianus, who was at the Council of Chalcedon. A source cited by Le Quien says that a bishop of Cotyaeum named Eusebius was at the Second Council of Constantinople in 553. Cosmas was at the Third Council of Constantinople in 680–681. Ioannes, a deacon, represented an unnamed bishop of Cotyaeum at the Trullan Council in 692. Bishop Constantinus was at the Second Council of Nicaea in 692, and Bishop Anthimus at the  Photian Council of Constantinople (879), No longer a residential bishopric, Cotyaeum is today listed by the Catholic Church as a titular see.

Ottoman period
Under the reign of Byzantine Emperor Justinian I the town was fortified with a double-line of walls and citadel. In 1071 Cotyaeum (or Kotyaion) fell to the Seljuk Turks and later switched hands, falling successively to the Crusaders, Germiyanids, and Timur-Leng (Tamerlane), until finally being incorporated into the Ottoman Empire in 1428. It was initially the center of Anatolia Eyalet till 1827, when the Hüdavendigâr Eyalet was formed. It was later center of the sancak within the borders of the Hüdavendigâr Vilayet in 1867. Troops of Ibrahim Pasha of Egypt briefly occupied it in 1833.

During this time a large number of Christian Armenians settled in Kotyaion/Kütahya, where they came to dominate the tile-making and ceramic-ware production. Kütahya emerged as a renowned center for the Ottoman ceramic industry, producing tiles and faience for mosques, churches, and official buildings in places all over the Middle East. The craft industry of Armenian ceramics in Jerusalem was started by Armenian ceramicist , master of a Kütahya workshop between 1907 and 1915, who was deported from Kütahya in early 1916, during the Armenian genocide, and rediscovered, living as a refugee in Aleppo in 1918, by Sir Mark Sykes, a former patron. Sykes connected him to the new military governor of Jerusalem, Sir Ronald Storrs, and arranged for Ohannessian to travel to Jerusalem to participate in a planned British restoration of the Dome of the Rock.

The fortifications of the city and its environs, which were vital to the security and economic prosperity of the region, were built and rebuilt from antiquity through the Ottoman Period. However, the dates assigned to the many periods of construction and the assessment of the military architecture are open to various interpretations.

At the end of the nineteenth century the population of the kaza of Kütahya numbered 120,333, of which 4,050 were Greeks, 2,533 Armenians, 754 Catholics, and the remainder Turks and other Muslim ethnicities. Kütahya and the district itself were spared the ravages of the Armenian genocide of 1915, when the Ottoman governor, Faruk Ali Bey, went to extreme lengths to protect the Armenian population from being uprooted and sent away on death marches. However, Faruk Ali Bey was removed from office in March 1916, and the city's Armenian community suffered in the aftermath under the rule of his successor, Ahmet Mufti Bey. Kütahya was occupied by the Greek Army on 17 July 1921 after Battle of Kütahya–Eskişehir during the Turkish War of Independence and was then captured in ruins by the Turkish Army after the Battle of Dumlupınar during the Great Offensive on 30 August 1922.

Economy

The industries of Kütahya have long traditions, going back to ancient times. 

Kütahya is famous for its kiln products, such as tiles and pottery, which are glazed and multicoloured. Modern industries are sugar refining, tanning, nitrate processing and different products of meerschaum, which is extracted nearby. 

In the Ottoman period, Kütahya was a major cotton production center of the empire. Modern local agricultural industry produces cereals, fruits and sugar beet. In addition stock raising is of much importance. Not far from Kütahya there are important mines extracting lignite.

Traditional ceramics
A small ewer, now in the British Museum, gave its name to a category of similar blue and white fritware pottery known as 'Abraham of Kütahya ware'. It has an inscription in Armenian script under the glaze on its base stating that it commemorated Abraham of Kütahya with a date of 1510. In 1957 Arthur Lane published an influential article in which he reviewed the history of pottery production in the region and proposed that 'Abraham of Kütahya' ware was produced from 1490 until around 1525, 'Damascus' and 'Golden Horn' ware were produced from 1525 until 1555 and 'Rhodian' ware from around 1555 until the demise of the İznik pottery industry at the beginning of the 18th century. This chronology has been generally accepted.

Climate
Kütahya has a warm-summer Mediterranean climate (Köppen climate classification: Csb), or a warm-summer humid continental climate (Dsb), with chilly, wet, often snowy winters and warm, dry summers. Precipitation occurs mostly during the winter and spring, but can be observed throughout the year.

Kütahya is forecast to be the city most affected by global warming in Turkey.

Culture
Kütahya's old neighbourhoods are dominated by traditional Ottoman houses made of wood and stucco, some of the best examples being found along Germiyan Caddesi. It has many historical mosques such as Ulu Camii, Cinili Camii, Balikli Camii and Donenler Camii. The Şengül Hamamı is a famous Turkish bath located in the city

The town preserves some ancient ruins, a Byzantine castle and church. During late centuries Kütahya has been renowned for its Turkish earthenware, of which fine specimens may be seen at the national capital. The Kütahya Museum has a fine collection of arts and cultural artifacts from the area, the house where Hungarian statesman Lajos Kossuth lived in exile between 1850 and 1851 is preserved as a museum.

Education

The Main Campus and the Germiyan Campus of the Kütahya Dumlupınar University are located in the city.

Transport

The main bus station has bus links to most major Turkish cities. Zafer Airport is active. Kütahya is also the main railroad endpoint for the Aegean region.

International relations

Twin towns — Sister cities
Kütahya is twinned with:

  Bavly, Tatarstan, Russia
  Bikaner, India
  Pécs, Hungary
  Anqing, China
  Danniyeh, Lebanon

Notable people 
 Alexander of Cotiaeum (c.70-80CE - c.150CE), Greek grammarian
 Evliya Çelebi (1611-1682), traveler and author.
 Kadri Paşa (1832-1884), Ottoman Grand Vizier
 Komitas (1869-1935), Armenian composer, musicologist
 Âsım Gündüz (1889-1970), military officer in Ottoman and Turkish armies
 Mustafa Kalemli (born 1943), politician
 Ayla Dikmen (1944-1970), singer
 Abdullah Aymaz (born 1949), writer, journalist
 Aydilge Sarp (born 1979), singer
 Halil Akkaş (born 1983), middle-distance runner
 Özge Kırdar (born 1985), volleyball player
 Veli Kızılkaya (born 1985), football player
 Danla Bilic (born 1994), internet personality
 Hande Baladın (born 1997), volleyball player

See also
 Anatolian Tigers
 Evliya Çelebi Way
 Kumari (Kutahya)
 Ancient city Aizanoi

Gallery

References

Source and external links 

 The Government of Kütahya
 Province Culture And Tourism Directorate
 City of Tiles
 Pictures from Kütahya
 Kütahya weather forecast information
 Photos of ancient Roman city of Aizanoi in Kütahya
 Photos from another source of ancient Roman city of Aizanoi in Kütahya province
 A website about a nitrate processing factory in Kütahya
 A website about the sugar refinery facility in Kütahya
 Official website of Kütahya Ceramic Company
 Kütahya Photo Forum

 
Districts of Kütahya Province